Westmount Public Library (French: Bibliothèque publique de Westmount) (WPL) is located at 4574 Sherbrooke Street West, Westmount, Quebec, Canada, in the northwest corner of Westmount Park. Designed by Robert Findlay, it opened in 1899.

History

The library was founded in 1897 to commemorate the Diamond Jubilee of then-reigning Queen Victoria. Robert Findlay was selected as the architect, and construction took place between 1898 and 1899. The total cost at that time was $16,375. This was for the books, furniture, and building itself.

On June 20, 1898, the gala opening of the library took place. Records from that time indicate a collection of 1,992 books and 694 borrowers.

In 1940, members of the Active Service garrisoned in Westmount were given access to library services and the reading room. The library also took on the role of receiving station for magazine and book donations on the behalf of the Canadian Armed Forces.

The library experienced a sharp decline of book purchases in 1943. This was because of the low quality of paper and bindings. During that same year, the Library became the curator for the entirety of the collected material of the recently established Westmount Historical Association.

Between 1943 and 1949, the alphabet system was replaced by the Dewey Decimal System. A re-cataloguing and re-classification of books took place.

For 5 weeks during 1946, the Children's Department was forced to close due to an epidemic of polio.

In 1948, two hundred guests were invited to celebrate the 50th anniversary of the library.

Recent times

By-law 82 was revised in 1988. It thereafter stated that the "Trustees will be appointed by Council and all residents as well as property owners are eligible for appointment."

The 90th anniversary celebrations for the library were held in 1989.

In 1990, research commenced regarding a possible renovation and extension of the library. In 1991, after a poll, the citizens approved a renewal and enlargement plan. Renovations commenced in 1994. During that time, the adult and reference collections were temporarily moved to 4225 Saint Catherine Street and the Children's Department, Audiovisual, Technical Services and Administration were located at Victoria Hall beside the library. Also in 1994, the library acquired Internet access, the first to do so in Quebec. A year later, in 1995, the new addition and renovations were finished.

The library's website became available in 1996.

In 2002, resulting from a Montreal merger, membership increased 60% to 14,181 and circulation increased 30% to 425,218. This was because the merger allowed all residents of the Island of Montreal have free memberships. In 2003, the library's circulation passed the 450,000 mark with an average of 38 items per member.

Building improvements

In 1911, The Children's Department was opened. Findlay, the architect, designed the extension. It included a workroom as well as a basement book receiving room.

In 1925, architect Findlay along with his son designed an addition to the library. It included more stack space, another reading room, as well as an office for the librarians. This new wing also contained a mezzanine floor, the art section and music section, and reference books.

Modernization and remodeling was finished in 1936. This involved the creation of a new workroom, the installation of concrete floors, new counters for book borrowers, and an air-conditioning system.

1959 saw major changes including the installation of new steel stacks able to contain nearly 100,000 items, a new shipping area and Children's Department. The former Children's Department was turned into offices, and the staff workroom was increased in size two-fold.

The Centennial Reference Room opened in 1967 and the entire library was carpeted to help reduce noise.

In 1972, Harry Mayerovitch designed new display facilities. That same year, the collection exceeded 100,000 items.

In 1981, an elevator was installed as well as a handicapped washroom.

Facilities

In 1914, over 500 books were sent to England to be rebound. The Library stacks became available to the public in 1917.

In 1984, the library set up its first microcomputer. It was an IBM PC acquired to serve as an upgrade to the automated cataloguing system. A videocassette collection was established for the first time in 1985.

An inter-library loan network was set up in 1979 connecting 15 other public libraries in Montreal.

Staff
In 1898, Miss Beatrice Glen Moore was hired to be the first librarian. Her salary started at $520 per year. Two years later, in 1900, another librarian was hired by the name of Ms. Mary Solace Saxe. She retired 30 years later in 1930 and a new Chief Librarian was hired named Kathleen Jenkins. In 1962, Mrs. Norah Bryant was selected as Chief Librarian. Rosemary Lydon became Chief Librarian in 1982. In 1990, six new staff positions were created.

Gallery

See also

 Atwater Library, the other library in Westmount

References

External links

Official website

Buildings and structures in Westmount, Quebec
Tudor Revival architecture in Canada
Library buildings completed in 1899
Libraries in Montreal
1898 establishments in Quebec
Robert Findlay buildings
Sandstone buildings in Canada
Libraries established in 1899